Christopher O. Mohan is a United States Army lieutenant general who has served as the deputy commanding general of the United States Army Materiel Command since December 2, 2022. He has also served as the commanding general of the United States Army Sustainment Command, 21st Theater Sustainment Command, and 3rd Sustainment Command (Expeditionary).

Military career 

In November 2022, Mohan was nominated for promotion to lieutenant general.

References

External links

Living people
United States Army generals
Year of birth missing (living people)